David-Vital Landry (July 14, 1866 – December 18, 1929) was a doctor, farmer and political figure of Acadian descent in New Brunswick, Canada. He represented Kent County in the Legislative Assembly of New Brunswick from 1908 to 1917 as a Conservative member.

He was born in Memramcook, New Brunswick, the son of Vital J. Landry and Mathilde D. Cormier, and was educated at the College of Saint Joseph and the Université Laval. He taught school for a time before he received his degree in medicine. He set up practice in Memramcook and then Bouctouche. In 1896, Landry married Annie-Marie Michaud.

Political life
David-Vital Landry served on the municipal council for Wellington. Landry served on the province's Executive Council as Commissioner for Agriculture, and then Provincial Secretary-Treasurer (Minister of Finance). Landry was defeated in 1917 and ran unsuccessfully for a seat in the provincial assembly in 1920 and 1925.

In 1927, Dr. Landry was named health officer for the northern counties. He died two years later in Bathurst at the age of 63 and was buried in the St. Jean Baptiste Roman Catholic Cemetery in Bouctouche.

External links 
Biography at the Dictionary of Canadian Biography Online

1866 births
1929 deaths
St. Joseph's College alumni
Université Laval alumni
Canadian schoolteachers
Physicians from Newfoundland and Labrador
Members of the Executive Council of New Brunswick
People from Westmorland County, New Brunswick
People from Kent County, New Brunswick
Acadian people
New Brunswick municipal councillors
Progressive Conservative Party of New Brunswick MLAs